En sømand går i land is a 1954 Danish comedy film directed by Lau Lauritzen Jr. and starring Poul Reichhardt.

Cast
Poul Reichhardt as Vladimir W. Olsen
Lau Lauritzen, Jr. as Frederik Larsen
Mogens Hermansen as Portneren i sømandshjemmet
Carl Johan Hviid as Bestyrer Nielsen i sømandshjemmet
Fernanda Movin as Fru Nielsen
Jørn Jeppesen as Pastor Poulsen
Knud Heglund as Hr. Jespersen
Paul Hagen as Værtshusgæst
Emil Hass Christensen - Politiassistenten
Ib Schønberg as Bach / 'Beethoven'
Carl Ottosen as Herman
Per Gundmann as Hermans ledsager
Lisbeth Movin as Inger Knudsen
Marie Brink as Fru Mortensen
Birgitte Bruun as Esther
Tove Grandjean as Dame på mødrehjælpens kontor
Thorkil Lauritzen as Afdelingschef i stormagasin

External links

1954 films
1950s Danish-language films
Danish black-and-white films
Films directed by Lau Lauritzen Jr.
Films scored by Sven Gyldmark
ASA Filmudlejning films
Danish comedy films
1954 comedy films